Bertie Joseph Tuckwell (6 October 1882 – 2 January 1943) was an Australian-born cricketer who played first-class cricket in Australia and New Zealand.

Born in Melbourne, Tuckwell played three first-class matches for Victoria in 1903. On his first-class debut in 1902-03, in Victoria's first-ever match against Queensland, he scored 93 not out, batting at number seven, before Victoria declared. Victoria won by an innings. He moved to New Zealand and continued his cricket career, playing for Otago and Wellington. 

He toured Australia with the New Zealand team in 1913-14, and later that season he played for New Zealand against the touring Australian team in New Zealand. In the first of the two international matches, batting at number three, he top-scored for New Zealand in the first innings with 50, but he was omitted from the team for the second match. As well as being an attractive batsman, strong on the cut, he was a reliable slips fieldsman.

Tuckwell was a prominent businessman in Wellington. He died there on 2 January 1943 after a short illness. He was survived by his son and two daughters.

See also
 List of Victoria first-class cricketers
 List of Otago representative cricketers
 List of Wellington representative cricketers

References

External links

1882 births
1943 deaths
Australian cricketers
Pre-1930 New Zealand representative cricketers
Victoria cricketers
Cricketers from Melbourne
Australian emigrants to New Zealand
Otago cricketers
Wellington cricketers